Euseius naindaimei is a species of mite in the family Phytoseiidae.

References

naindaimei
Articles created by Qbugbot
Animals described in 1965